Viga may refer to:

 Viga, Catanduanes, Philippines
 Viga (river), Russia
 Viga (architecture), a wooden beam characteristic of adobe buildings of the southwestern United States and northern Mexico
 La Viga metro station, in Mexico City, Mexico
 La Viga (Mexico City Metrobús), a BRT station in Mexico City
 La Viga (Mexibús), a BRT station in Ecatepec, State of Mexico

See also
 Vega (disambiguation)